Silyanov Peak is the sharp peak in Ellsworth Mountains, Antarctica rising to 2235 m near the end of the side ridge that trends 14.3 km from the peak standing on the main crest of north-central Sentinel Range just north of Mount Hale northwestwards to Memolli Nunatak.  It has steep and mostly ice-free east and southwest slopes.

The peak is named after the Bulgarian revolutionary, historian and journalist Hristo Silyanov (1880-1939).

Location
US mapping in 1961.

Maps
 Newcomer Glacier.  Scale 1:250 000 topographic map.  Reston, Virginia: US Geological Survey, 1961.
 Antarctic Digital Database (ADD). Scale 1:250000 topographic map of Antarctica. Scientific Committee on Antarctic Research (SCAR). Since 1993, regularly updated.

Notes

References
 Silyanov Peak. SCAR Composite Gazetteer of Antarctica.
 Bulgarian Antarctic Gazetteer. Antarctic Place-names Commission. (details in Bulgarian, basic data in English)

External links
 Silyanov Peak. Copernix satellite image

Ellsworth Mountains
Bulgaria and the Antarctic
Mountains of Ellsworth Land